John Syme Duncan Blackwood (born 25 January 1935) is a retired Scottish professional footballer who played as an inside forward in the Football League.

References

1935 births
Living people
Scottish footballers
Accrington Stanley F.C. (1891) players
York City F.C. players
English Football League players
Girvan F.C. players
Footballers from East Ayrshire
Association football inside forwards